Royal Cercle Sportif Brainois is a Wallonian Belgian football club from Braine-l'Alleud, Brabant. Founded in 1913, club is assigned matricule nr.75 and is one the oldest continuously existing clubs in the country.

History
The club was founded in 1913 by 11 founding members. under the name Cercle Sportif Branois. In 1926, when the matricule system was established, club was assigned matricule nr.75, which it has kept to this day.

Throughout its history, the club has spent 32 seasons at national level, of which 12 were in the third tier.

Between 1946 and 1969 the club was continuously in the lower national league, however since they have been oscillating between the provincial leagues and national amateur tiers.

Over the years the most famous players were Antoine Puttaert and Fernand Voussure, both former internationals who finished their career at the club, and Philippe Saint-Jean who spent six seasons in the 70s with them 
before returning as a coach in the late 80s.

Honours and achievements
Belgian Fourth Division
Champions: 1956-57
Belgian Division 3
Runners-up: 2018-19
Belgian Cup
Fourth Round: 2005-06

References

External links

Football clubs in Belgium
Association football clubs established in 1913
1913 establishments in Belgium